Khowang College, established in 1982, is a major and general degree college situated in Khowang, Dibrugarh district, Assam. This college is affiliated with the Dibrugarh University.

Departments

Arts and Commerce
Assamese
Bengali
English
History
Education
Economics
Philosophy
Political Science
Sociology
Commerce

References

External links
http://khowangcollege.edu.in/

Universities and colleges in Assam
Colleges affiliated to Dibrugarh University
Educational institutions established in 1982
1982 establishments in Assam